Henry John de Suffren Disney (22 September 1919 – 26 March 2014), better known as John Disney, was an Australian ornithologist of British origin.

Early years
Disney was educated at Cambridge University. He collected birds in Newfoundland and northern Finland. During the Second World War he served in the Royal Air Force.

Africa
Disney spent many years of his career in Africa, first as Science Assistant to the Director of the Kaffrarian Museum, King William's Town, South Africa 1946–1948. He then worked at a cotton research station in East Africa 1948–1962.

Australia
In 1962 Disney moved to Australia to become Curator of Birds at the Australian Museum, a position he served in until his retirement, after which he was a research associate at the museum. In 1975 he led a team of zoologists and ecologists to Lord Howe Island to study the endangered Lord Howe woodhen in its environment,  in order to devise a management plan to prevent its extinction. At the time there were no more than 32 woodhens on the island. In 2019 there are over 250 birds.

References

1919 births
2014 deaths
Australian ornithologists
English emigrants to Australia